Eagle Lake is a lake in Carver County, Minnesota, in the United States.

Eagle Lake was named from the fact an eagle's nest was seen there by early settlers.

See also
List of lakes in Minnesota

References

Lakes of Minnesota
Lakes of Carver County, Minnesota